Fabián Turnes (born January 12, 1965 in Buenos Aires) is a former Argentine rugby union player and a current coach. He played as a centre.

Turnes played at Banco Nación, from 1983/84 to 1988/89, where he won two titles of Argentine Champion, in 1985/86 and 1988/89. He then would play for Amatori Rugby San Donà (1989/90), Cesena and Amatori Catania, in Italy, returning for two final seasons at Banco Nación, where he would end his career in 1997/98. He then started a coaching career. 

He had 29 caps for Argentina, from 1985 to 1997, scoring 63 points, 5 tries, 5 conversions, 10 penalties and 1 drop goal. He played two matches at the 1987 Rugby World Cup finals.

He was nominated, after the 2007 Rugby World Cup finals, one of the head coaches of Argentina, with Santiago Phelan.

External links
Fabián Turnes International Statistics

1965 births
Living people
Argentine rugby union players
Argentine rugby union coaches
Rugby union players from Buenos Aires
Rugby union centres
Argentina national rugby union team coaches
Argentina international rugby union players